Threshers Bush or Thresher's Bush is a hamlet and road in the civil parishes of both Matching and High Laver, and the Epping Forest district of Essex, England.

Settlements within 1 mile include the hamlets of Hastingwood (southwest), Foster Street (west) and Magdalen Laver (southeast).

Threshers Bush public house is The John Barleycorn at the east of the hamlet

References 
 A-Z Essex (page 55)

Hamlets in Essex
Epping Forest District
Matching, Essex